Reina Dorada (Spanish for "Golden Queen"; born January 9, 1998) is the ring name of a Mexican luchadora enmascarada, or masked female professional wrestler. She is currently a freelancer working for the Mexican professional wrestling promotion Lucha Libre AAA Worldwide (AAA) as well as the independent circuit. Her real name is not a matter of public record, as is often the case with masked wrestlers in Mexico where their private lives are kept concealed from the general public.

Reina Dorada has been one of the biggest female names on the independent scene in Mexico City since the mid-2010s and has wrestled in major independent promotions such as Generación XXI and Caralucha, as well as occasional appearances in Consejo Mundial de Lucha Libre (CMLL). Since 2019, she has also been wrestling in Kaoz Lucha Libre, a partner of AAA. She has a background in taekwando and has a black belt.

Professional wrestling career
Reina Dorada's birth name has not been revealed, nor reported on, which is a tradition in Lucha Libre when a wrestler has not been unmasked.

Championships and accomplishments
Kaoz Lucha Libre
Kaoz Women's Championship (1 time)

Footnotes

References

External links 
 

1998 births
Living people
Mexican female professional wrestlers
Masked wrestlers
Unidentified wrestlers
Professional wrestlers from Mexico City